Detroit is an album by the Gerald Wilson Orchestra recorded in 2009 and released on the Mack Avenue label.

Reception

AllMusic rated the album with 4 stars; in his review, Michael G. Nastos noted: "A quite spirited and energetic music is heard here from the 90-year-old Wilson, whose charm and wit would rival anyone many decades his junior. It's a swinging affair molded in the traditional big-band visage of Count Basie, Ernie Wilkins, or early Quincy Jones, with Wilson's deft touch for embellishing the blues". In JazzTimes Owen Cordle wrote: "Wilson’s chord progressions, chord voicings and rhythmic figures for the ensemble are strong characteristics of his writing. He also has a flair for atmospheric themes. One could quibble about the combo-esque strings of solos and the scarcity of ensemble interludes. Nevertheless, his writing style continues to serve him well". On All About Jazz Robert J. Robbins noted: "Gerald Wilson's six-movement "Detroit Suite" demonstrates that after nearly seven decades in the music business, the nonagenarian composer and arranger still has a great deal to offer in terms of musical creativity".

Track listing 
All compositions by Gerald Wilson.
 "Blues on Belle Isle" - 5:30
 "Cass Tech" - 8:47
 "Detroit" - 6:40
 "Miss Gretchen" - 7:07
 "Before Motown" - 7:12
 "The Detroit River" - 8:47
 "Everywhere" - 12:32
 "Aram" - 6:12

Personnel 

Gerald Wilson - arranger, conductor
Los Angeles Band (tracks 1-6):
Jeff Kaye, Rick Baptist, Winston Bird, Ron Barrows - trumpet
Eric Jorgensen, Les Benedict, Mike Wimberly, Shaunte Palmer - trombone
Carl Randall, Kamasi Washington, Jackie Kelso, Louis Van Taylor, Randall Willis, Terry Laudry - reeds
Brian O' Rourke - piano
Trey Henry - bass
Mell Lee - drums
Special guests: Sean Jones - trumpet, flugelhorn and Anthony Wilson - guitar
New York Band (tracks 7 & 8):
Jon Faddis, Frank Greene, Sean Jones, Jimmy Owens, Terrell Stafford - trumpet
Dennis Wilson, Luis Bonilla, Jay Ashby, Douglas Purviance - trombone
Steve Wilson, Antonio Hart, Ron Blake, Kamasi Washington, Ronnie Cuber - reeds
Renee Rosnes - piano
Peter Washington - bass
Anthony Wilson - guitar
Lewis Nash - drums
Special guest: Hubert Laws - flute

References 

Gerald Wilson albums
2009 albums
Mack Avenue Records albums
Albums arranged by Gerald Wilson
Albums conducted by Gerald Wilson